Fulbrook is a new community in Fulshear near Houston in Texas in the United States.

External links 

 Fulbrook Community Website

Geography of Fort Bend County, Texas